Robert Nicol Shearer (29 October 1892 – 15 December 1957) was an Australian rules footballer who played with Essendon in the Victorian Football League (VFL).

References

External links 

1892 births
1957 deaths
Australian rules footballers from Victoria (Australia)
Essendon Football Club players